Kucheh (also Romanized as Kūcheh or Koocheh; also known as Gūcheh Gūrīn and Kūcheh Gāvdīn) is a village in Gowdin Rural District, in the Central District of Kangavar County, Kermanshah Province, Iran. At the 2006 census, its population was 656, in 171 families.

References 

Populated places in Kangavar County